The 2009 season was Molde's 2nd consecutive year in Tippeligaen, and their 33rd season in the top flight of Norwegian football. They competed in Tippeligaen where they finished in 2nd position and the Norwegian Cup where they were defeated by Aalesund in the Norwegian Cup Final.

Squad

Transfers

Winter

In:

 

Out:

Summer

In:

Out:

Competitions

Tippeligaen

Results summary

Results by round

Fixtures

League table

Norwegian Cup

Final

Squad statistics

Appearances and goals

|-
|colspan="14"|Players away from Molde on loan:
|-
|colspan="14"|Players that left Molde during the season:
|}

Goal Scorers

Disciplinary record

See also
Molde FK seasons

References 

2009
Molde